All Through Winter is the debut studio album by Australian indie-folk duo, Georgia Fair. It was released on 21 October 2011 by Sony Music Australia, peaking at No. 61 on the ARIA Albums Chart and reaching No. 1 on the related ARIA Hitseekers Albums Chart. The album was recorded at the Echo Mountain Studios, Asheville, North Carolina and the Glow in the Dark Studios in Atlanta, Georgia and was produced by Bill Reynolds (Band of Horses). The group toured Australia to promote the album.

Track list

Personnel

Georgia Fair
 Jordan Wilson – vocals, acoustic guitar, harmonica
 Ben Riley – guitars, vocals

Additional musicians
 Bill Reynolds – bass, acoustic guitar, toms, keyboards, tambourine, omni-chord
 Tyler Ramsay – piano, mellotron, rhodes, omni-chord
 Seth Kauffman – drums, rhodes, electric guitar
 Brian Landrum – drums ("Where You Been?", "Float Away", "Halfway Gone")
 Mike Rhodes – drums ("Times Fly")
 Matt Goldman – drums ("Blind")
 Mike Brown – slide guitar, percussion, piano, banjo ("Where You Been?")

Recording
 Bill Reynolds – producer
 Danny Kadar, Matt Goldman, Jason Kingsland – engineer
 Matt Goldman – mixer
 Bob Ludwig – mastering

References

2011 albums